Grand Prix (meaning Grand Prize; plural Grands Prix), is a name sometimes used for competitions or sport events, alluding to the winner receiving a prize, trophy or honour

Grand Prix or grand prix may refer to:

Arts and entertainment

Films
 Grand Prix (1934 film), a British motorsports drama film
 Grand Prix (1966 film), a U.S. drama film about Formula One motor racing
 Grand Prix (2010 film), a South Korean horseracing drama film
 Grand Prix (2022 film), an upcoming Czech film

Music
 Grand Prix (album), by Teenage Fanclub
 Grand Prix (band), English rock band
 European Grand Prix for Choral Singing, an annual choral competition between the winners of six European choral competitions
 Eurovision Song Contest (originally named Grand Prix d'Eurovision de la Chanson)
Dansk Melodi Grand Prix, Danish selection for Eurovision Song Contest
Melodi Grand Prix, Norwegian selection for Eurovision Song Contest

Table or card games
 Grand Prix (Magic: The Gathering), magic tournaments

Television
 "Grand Prix" (CSI: Miami), seventh episode from second season of CSI: Miami
 Grand Prix (TV programme), BBC Television's TV coverage of Formula One motor racing

Video games 
 Grand Prix (video game) by Activision
 F-1 Sensation, the Japanese/European version of the cancelled NES game Grand Prix
 Formula One Grand Prix (video game)
 Grand Prix 2
 Grand Prix 3
 Grand Prix 4
 Grand Prix Challenge, by Atari
 Grand Prix Circuit (video game), by Accolade
 Grand Prix Legends (1967 season)
 Mario Kart Arcade GP, an arcade game in the Mario Kart series.
 Mario Kart Arcade GP 2
 Mario Kart Arcade GP VR
 Mario Kart Arcade GP DX

Awards 
 Grand Prix de Rome, scholarship awarded in France from 1663 to 1968
 Grand Prix (Belgian Film Critics Association)
 Grand Prix at Brussels International Film Festival (BRIFF)
 Grand Prix (Cannes Film Festival)
 Grand Prix at International Film Festival Bratislava
 Grand Prix de la ville d'Angoulême, a comics award
 Grand Prix de Littérature Policière, annual literary award for French and international crime fiction
 Grand prix Gobert is one of the prizes of the French Academy. It has been awarded every year in the field of history since 1834.
 Les Grands Prix, annual awards from the foundations of the Institut de France

Sports competitions

Athletics 
 IAAF Grand Prix Final, an athletics competitions replaced by the IAAF World Athletics Final
 IAAF Super Grand Prix, a series of athletics meetings held until 2009
 Some of the meetings in the series that succeeded the IAAF Super Grand Prix
 Adidas Grand Prix
 British Grand Prix (athletics)
 London Grand Prix
 Qatar Athletic Super Grand Prix
 Shanghai Golden Grand Prix

Chess 
 FIDE Grand Prix
 Grand Prix Attack, a chess opening
 USCF Grand Prix

Combat sports 
 D-Oh Grand Prix, annual professional wrestling tournament held by DDT Pro-Wrestling
 Dream Grand Prix, various mixed martial arts Dream Grand Prix tournaments
 International Fight League (IFL) Grand Prix, various mixed martial arts IFL Grand Prix tournaments
 International Wrestling Grand Prix, the governing body for the wrestling promotion New Japan Pro-Wrestling
 K-1 World Grand Prix, K-1's annual kickboxing World Grand Prix tournaments
 Pride Grand Prix, held by Pride Fighting Championships
 Strikeforce Grand Prix, a competition run by Strikeforce

Cycling
 Grand Prix Chantal Biya, a road bicycle racing event
 Grand Prix Velo Alanya (disambiguation)
 U.S. Gran Prix of Cyclocross, a cyclo-cross bicycle racing series

Equestrianism 
 Grand Prix, now Prix Gladiateur, a horse race in France since 1862
 Grand Prix Dressage
 Grand Prix show jumping
 Nakayama Grand Prix, original name of the Arima Kinen horse race in Japan

Motorsport 
There are many articles about series of races of different types such as Malaysian Grand Prix (F1), and individual races such as 2009 Malaysian Grand Prix, not all listed here
 A1 Grand Prix
 Aero GP, flying competition
 D1 Grand Prix
 Grand Prix Masters
 Grand Prix motor racing, major races since 1907, governed by Formula One (F1) since 1950
 List of Formula One Grands Prix
Formula One
 Macau Grand Prix (not F1)
 New Zealand Grand Prix (not F1)
 Grand Prix motorcycle Road Racing, known commonly as MotoGP after its premier class
 List of Grand Prix motorcycle races
 Purdue Grand Prix, a Go-Kart race held at Purdue University
 Speedway Grand Prix (motorcycle speedway)
 MXGP, main class in Motocross World Championship

Snooker
 Grand Prix (snooker), a former name of the World Open
 World Grand Prix (snooker)
 Six-red World Grand Prix, a former name of the Sangsom Six-red World Championship

Tennis 
 Budapest Grand Prix
 Grand Prix tennis circuit
 Marrakech Grand Prix
 Porsche Tennis Grand Prix

Other sports
 World Grand Prix (darts)
 FIVB World Grand Prix, for women's volleyball
 Grand Prix de Futsal, international futsal competition
 Grand Prix gliding
 ISU Grand Prix of Figure Skating
 Rhythmic Gymnastics Grand Prix Series
 Sevens Grand Prix Series
 The Grand Prix, greyhound racing competition

Other uses 
 Pontiac Grand Prix, an American automobile formerly manufactured by General Motors

See also

 Prix
 MotoGP (disambiguation)
 
 Grand (disambiguation)
 GP (disambiguation)
 Tourist Trophy (disambiguation), a "big trophy" awarded in some sport competitions